The ranks and insignia of the German Red Cross (Deutsches Rotes Kreuz, abbr. DRK) were the paramilitary rank system used by the national Red Cross Society in Germany during World War II.

Insignia

Men's uniforms and insignia of The German Red Cross (Deutsches Rotes Kreuz, DRK) during The Nazi era (Ruhl: Deutsche Uniformen 1930s
Medics within the German Red Cross would wear helmets with special decals with the Red Cross eagle. Likewise, were the belt buckle issued with the same eagle.

Rank Insignia

Nurse ranks

See also
 Comparative ranks of Nazi Germany

References